The following is a list of radio stations owned by Audacy, Inc.  As of November 2017, Audacy (then known as Entercom) operates 235 radio stations in 48 media markets across the United States.

On February 2, 2017, Entercom announced that it had agreed to acquire CBS Radio. The purchase gave Entercom operations in 23 of the top 25 markets, making it the second-largest owner of radio stations in the United States, behind only iHeartMedia. The merger became official on November 17, 2017.

Arizona

California

Colorado

Connecticut

District of Columbia

Florida

Georgia

Illinois

Kansas

Louisiana

Maryland

Massachusetts

Michigan

Minnesota

Missouri

Nevada

New York

North Carolina

Ohio

Oregon

Pennsylvania

Rhode Island

South Carolina

Tennessee

Texas

Virginia

Washington

Wisconsin

References

Audacy